Derbidae is a family of insects in the order Hemiptera, the true bugs. It is one of the largest and most diverse families of planthoppers. It is widely distributed around the world, especially in the tropics, and with many species in subtropical and temperate regions.

Adult derbids feed on plants, and nymphs feed on fungi, Many adults are host-specific, feeding on a single plant species, and hide under leaves.

Many derbids are easily recognized as such by their "unusual" appearance, while others are less distinctive and difficult to identify. The family is characterized by a row of spines on the rear leg and a short segment at the tip of the beak. The head may be quite compressed in shape. The wings are variable. Some species hold their wings outward at rest as moths do, while others keep them parallel to the body. Some have simple wings, and others have very long forewings and short hindwings.
Derbids range in size from 8-11mm. 

The family Derbidae was first identified/described by Maximilian Spinola in 1839. Derbids are the third-most species rich family of planthoppers. Derbidae is most diverse in the southeast. There are 13 genera and 55 species. This family, however, is not well reported and the records seem noticeably scarce in some states. Some adults are typically associated with monocot plants most likely near their habitat as larvae. They vary from 8-11mm in length. They have the largest species richness in the topics. To protect their fragile wings, it has been noted that adults will convene under broad leaves. Fennah revised the higher taxonomy of the family Derbidae in 1952. Then in 1996, Emeljanov re-examined the taxonomy. Derbids median carina is outmoded, the parameres of the male are elongated, and the head is either slightly or greatly compressed. The subfamilies Otiocerinae and Derbinae have an odd appearance with their wings longer than their body and a severely compressed head. There are no known pests in this family, but they are being considered as possible vectors of diseases to palm trees in Florida. While there are more species of the family Derbidae in the tropics, this group is poorly studied and misrepresented as a whole.

The family Derbidae contains nearly 1700 species in about 159 genera. These are classified in four subfamilies:
Cedusinae
Derbinae
Otiocerinae
Zoraidinae

References

COLLEGE OF AGRICULTURE & NATURAL RESOURCES. (n.d.). Retrieved from http://canr.udel.edu/planthoppers/north-america/north-american-derbidae/ 
Family Derbidae - Derbid Planthoppers. (n.d.). Retrieved from https://bugguide.net/node/view/7463

External links
Family Derbidae - Derbid planthoppers.  Industry and Investment. New South Wales Government.

https://bugguide.net/node/view/7463
http://canr.udel.edu/planthoppers/north-america/north-american-derbidae/

 
Auchenorrhyncha families
Fulgoromorpha